is a 1952 Japanese film directed by Ishirō Honda. It is based on the story Dance of the Stormy Waves by Shinzo Kajino. The film was both produced and distributed by Toho, and released theatrically in Japan on November 27, 1952.

Plot 
At a port near Mt. Kinka, the only whaling base in Japan, Okabe, the captain of the whaling ship Tianjin Maru, said that he would settle the past prodigal life and seek a stable life in old age by his daughter Sonoko, who has a reputation for the town's restaurant Kiraku. It was sent to Maru's young driver Shinuma. Okabe hit eight on Shinuma because he went out and missed a big whale, but that night Shinuma was drunk and made a big blow to Okabe. As a result, Shinuma was newly assigned as the captain of the Tokumaru, and the natural Tianjin Maru and the Tokumaru were competing for fishing. Shingo Nishizawa, who gave birth to a woman Okabe abandoned a long time ago, has longed for her father, but she was attached to Shinuma with love for her father who was fighting for a woman against Niinuma. However, when Okabe's ship ran aground in stormy weather, Shinuma and Shingo bet their lives and rescued the crew of the Tianjin Maru. There is a man-to-man relationship, and on the deck of the new ship that will soon sail to the Southern Ocean, the bright smiles of Okabe, Shinuma, and Shingo are lined up, and Sonoko and Shingo's lover Akemi are on the pier to see off.

Cast 
Source:

References

Footnotes

Sources

External links

1952 films
Films directed by Ishirō Honda
1950s Japanese-language films
Toho films
Films produced by Tomoyuki Tanaka
Japanese drama films
1952 drama films
Japanese black-and-white films
1950s Japanese films